Verin Artashat is a village in the Artashat Municipality of the Ararat Province of Armenia. It sits adjacent to the ruins of the ancient city of Dvin.

References 

World Gazeteer: Armenia – World-Gazetteer.com

Populated places in Ararat Province
Yazidi populated places in Armenia